Mario García may refer to:

 Mario García (designer) (born 1947), American newspaper and magazine designer 
 Mario García Menocal (1866–1941), president of Cuba, 1913–1921
 Mario García Valdez, president of the Autonomous University of San Luis Potos
 Mario García (footballer, born 1967), Mexican football manager and former midfielder
 Mario García (footballer, born 1980), Mexican football manager and former defender
 Mario García (footballer, born 1999), Spanish football left-back
 Mario José García (born 1983), Spanish water polo player
 Mario García (athlete), Spanish runner